Ferdinand Balcárek (21 August 1904 – 16 January 1975) was a Czech architect. His work was part of the art competitions at the 1932 Summer Olympics and the 1948 Summer Olympics.

References

1904 births
1975 deaths
20th-century Czech architects
Olympic competitors in art competitions
Architects from Prague